Shamang is a poorly known Plateau language of Nigeria.

References

Central Plateau languages
Languages of Nigeria